Xenobots, named after the African clawed frog (Xenopus laevis), are synthetic lifeforms that are designed by computers to perform some desired function and built by combining together different biological tissues. Whether xenobots are robots, organisms, or something else entirely remains a subject of debate among scientists.

Existing xenobots 

The first xenobots were built by Douglas Blackiston according to blueprints generated by an AI program, which was developed by Sam Kriegman.

skin cells and heart muscle cells, both of which are derived from stem cells harvested from early (blastula stage) frog embryos.
The skin cells provide rigid support and the heart cells act as small motors, contracting and expanding in volume to propel the xenobot forward.
The shape of a xenobot's body, and its distribution of skin and heart cells, are automatically designed in simulation to perform a specific task, using a process of trial and error (an evolutionary algorithm).
Xenobots have been designed to walk, swim, push pellets, carry payloads, and work together in a swarm to aggregate debris scattered along the surface of their dish into neat piles.
They can survive for weeks without food and heal themselves after lacerations.

Other kinds of motors and sensors have been incorporated into xenobots.
Instead of heart muscle, xenobots can grow patches of cilia and use them as small oars for swimming.
However, cilia-driven xenobot locomotion is currently less controllable than cardiac-driven xenobot locomotion.
An RNA molecule can also be introduced to xenobots to give them molecular memory: if exposed to specific kind of light during behavior, they will glow a prespecified color when viewed under a fluorescence microscope.

Xenobots can also self-replicate. Xenobots can gather loose cells in their environment, forming them into new xenobots with the same capability.

Potential applications 

Currently, xenobots are primarily used as a scientific tool to understand how cells cooperate to build complex bodies during morphogenesis. However, the behavior and biocompatibility of current xenobots suggest several potential applications to which they may be put in the future.

Given that xenobots are composed solely of frog cells, they are biodegradable.
And as swarms of xenobots tend to work together to push microscopic pellets in their dish into central piles,
it has been speculated that future xenobots might be able do the same thing with microplastics in the ocean:
find and aggregate tiny bits of plastic into a large ball of plastic that a traditional boat or drone can gather and bring to a recycling center.
Unlike traditional technologies, xenobots do not add additional pollution as they work and degrade:
they behave using energy from fat and protein naturally stored in their tissue, which lasts about a week, at which point they simply turn into dead skin cells.

In future clinical applications, such as targeted drug delivery, xenobots could be made from a human patient’s own cells, which would bypass the immune response challenges of other kinds of micro-robotic delivery systems.
Such xenobots could potentially be used to scrape plaque from arteries, and with additional cell types and bioengineering, locate and treat disease.

Gallery

See also
 Artificial life

References

External links
 Webpage summarizing and linking to all of the xenobot papers
 Xenobot Lab website
 "These Researchers Used A.I. to Design a Completely New 'Animal Robot'"  from Scientific American

Artificial life
Emerging technologies
Robots
Microbiology
2020 in science
2020 robots
Microtechnology